The 1963 NCAA Skiing Championships were contested at the Solitude Ski Resort in Big Cottonwood Canyon, Utah at the tenth annual NCAA-sanctioned ski tournament to determine the individual and team national champions of men's collegiate alpine skiing, cross-country skiing, and ski jumping in the United States.

Denver, coached by Willy Schaeffler, captured their seventh, and third consecutive, national championship, again edging out rival Colorado in the team standings.

Jim Page of Dartmouth repeated as Skimeister (all four events). The downhill competition on Friday was a three-way tie, won by Dave Gorsuch of Western State and Colorado's Bill Marolt and Buddy Werner, who reclaimed the alpine combined title he won two years earlier. Future Olympic bronze medalist Jimmie Heuga of Colorado won Thursday's slalom, passing teammates Marolt and Werner in the second run.

Venue

This year's championships were held March 21–23 in Utah at Solitude in Big Cottonwood Canyon, southeast of Salt Lake City. The tenth edition, these were the second in Utah and the Wasatch Range; Snow Basin (on Mount Ogden) hosted six years earlier in 1957.

Team scoring

Individual events

Four events were held, which yielded seven individual titles.
Thursday: Slalom
Friday: Downhill, Cross Country
Saturday: Jumping

See also
List of NCAA skiing programs

References

NCAA Skiing Championships
NCAA Skiing Championships
NCAA Skiing Championships
NCAA Skiing Championships
NCAA Skiing Championships
NCAA Skiing Championships
NCAA Skiing Championships
Skiing in Utah